The Brooklyn Hip-Hop Festival (BHF) is an annual celebration of Hip-Hop music and culture. It is produced  The Bodega Agency a wholly owned subsidiary of Brooklyn Bodega, Inc.

Overview
According to the official BHF website, "Our aim is to highlight Hip-Hop’s legacy as an agent of artistic progression, community building and social change."

The festival is held during July at the Brooklyn Bridge Park, which is situated on the shores of the East River and is accessible by multiple subway and bus lines, the thruway and New York Water Taxi service.

Established in 2005, BHF has grown from a parking lot in Williamsburg to the largest hip hop event in New York City. The Festival's format centers around its Hip-Hop Performance Day and includes a variety of affiliated hip hop cultural events that occur in the days leading up to the festival. Besides its music programming, the festival also features a "Family Day" segment that has music, performances, demonstrations and seminars from a host of family centric organizations.

In 2012, the Festival continued its new format of programming with “Busta & Friends” and topped Festival history with a record-breaking 30,000+ in attendance (20,000 on its Performance Day). Busta Rhymes & Friends would feature classic hits performed with Spliff Star and a surprise line-up that included Buckshot of Black Moon, Smif-N-Wessun, Lil’ Fame of M.O.P., Slick Rick, Reek Da Villain. The icing on the cake was a Leaders Of The New School reunion with Charlie Brown and Dinco D which was 19 years in the making. The night ended with L.O.N.S performing “Scenario” and bringing Phife and Q-Tip out just as the cops killed the power.

According to Time Out, "(The BHF is) (d)ifferent from the bigger hip-hop packages like Rock the Bells that will be touring the U.S. all summer, this is a show that seems purely for New York, and it affords an opportunity for the artists to give back... Local businesses also showed their support, with booths ranging from Brooklyn Brewery to FLUD Watches and Hoodman Clothing." In 2010, NY1 interviewed Hip-Hop artist Torae who said "It's just awesome, you know, for new, upcoming artists like myself to be out here and perform with legends and get to touch people from young to old, every race." Steele (rapper) of the hip-hop duo Smif-N-Wessun added "It's packed -- no violence -- so it dispels all the myths that hip-hop brings violence and stuff. It's beautiful out there, it's young kids out there, it's older people out there. It's people from all walks."

The BHF is owned by Brooklyn Bodega, which uses the proceeds from the festival to support year-round cultural programming including but not limited to: the blogazine and online home BrooklynBodega.com, and most recently The Bodega Agency, our boutique marketing and branding operation.

History

The Festival has been held yearly since 2005 when it was founded by Wes Jackson, entrepreneur and current Executive Director and President of Brooklyn Bodega and co-founders, Gregory Trani and Douglas Nettingham. Since 2006, it has been hosted by Ralph McDaniels, who was responsible for creating Video Music Box, the first music video show focused exclusively to an urban market—broadcast on public television.

Below is a listing of past BHF performers:

2005
 Brand Nubian
 Little Brother
 Leela James
 Medina Green
 Ge-ology
 Amir

2006
 Big Daddy Kane
 Lupe Fiasco
 Rhymefest
 Sleepy Brown
 The Procussions
 Panacea aka Mathis Mootz
 Strange Fruit Project
 Cap Cee
 DJ Eclipse
 Rik Ducci
 Ralph McDaniels aka “Uncle Ralph” of Video Music Box

2007
 Ghostface Killah
 Consequence
 Skillz
 Dres (rapper) of Black Sheep
 Large Professor
 Emily King,
 Tanya Morgan
 PackFM
 El Michels Affair
 J.Period
 Ralph McDaniels aka “Uncle Ralph” of Video Music Box

2008
 KRS-One
 DJ Premier
 Buckshot
Blu & Exile
 Mickey factz
 88-Keys
 Zaki Inrahim
 Homeboy Sandman
 J.Period
 Ralph McDaniels aka “Uncle Ralph” of Video Music Box

2009
 Pharoahe Monch
 Styles P
 DJ Premier
 Dead Prez (stic.man and M-1)
 Grand Puba
 Smif-n-Wessun(Tek and Steele)
 Torae and Marco Polo
 J.Period
 Ralph McDaniels aka “Uncle Ralph” of Video Music Box
 Brown Bag All Stars
 Children Of The Night
 Donny Goines
 Keys N Krates
 Nyle
 Eagle Nebula
 Brokn Englsh
 Tiye Phoenix
 Metermaids
 Tanya Morgan
 Homeboy Sandman
 Chip Fu aka Roderick Roachford
 Kel Spencer
 DJ Parler
 DJ Misbehaviour

2010
 De La Soul
 Nice & Smooth (Greg Nice and Smooth B)
 Pete Rock & CL Smooth
 Q-Tip (musician) of A Tribe Called Quest
 DJ Premier
 Currensy
 Fashawn
 Buckshot
 Evil Dee of Da Beatminerz and Black Moon (group)
 Smif-n-Wessun (Tek and Steele)
 Bobbito García
 Masta Ace
 Dres (rapper) of Black Sheep
 Group Home (Lil' Dap and Melachi the Nutcracker)
 DJ Rob Swift of The X-Ecutioners
 DJ Spinna
 J. Period
 Black Milk
 Diamond District
 Money Making Jam Boys
 J Dilla Ensemble
 Ma Dukes Yancey
 Skyzoo
 Waajeed
 DJ Rhettmatic of Beat Junkies
 DJ Babu of Beat Junkies
 Rakka Iriscience of Dilated Peoples
 Ralph McDaniels aka “Uncle Ralph” of Video Music Box
 DJ Das
 DJ Parler
 Aquil
 Those Chosen
 Kalae All Day
 The Crowd

2011
"Q-Tip & Friends" special presentation:
 Q-Tip (musician) 
 Kanye West
 Black Thought of The Roots
 Busta Rhymes
 Monie Love
 Ali Shaheed Muhammad of A Tribe Called Quest
 M.O.P (Lil’ Fame + Billy Danze)

Additional artists:
 Random Axe (Sean Price, Guilty Simpson, Black Milk)
 Kendrick Lamar
 Artifacts (group) (El da Sensei, Tame One, DJ Kaos)
 GrandWizzard Theodore
 Camp Lo  (Sonny Cheeba + Geechi Suede)
 Homeboy Sandman
 J- Live
 Mista Sinista of The X-Ecutioners
 DJ Boogie Blind of The X-Ecutioners
 Eternia (rapper)
 Rah Digga
 Lords of the Underground (Mr. Funke, DoltAll Dupre and DJ Lord Jazz)
 DJ Roli Rho 
 Diamond District (Oddisee, X.O. + yU)
 Chairman Mao of Egotripland
 DJ Twilite Tone
 Marley Marl
 Cold Crush Brothers
 Force MDs
 Roxanne Shante
 Craig G of the Juice Crew
 Keith Murray
 Jamel Shabazz
 Nitty Scott, MC
 Shad (rapper)
 DJ Parler
 Kid Glyde
 DJ GETLIVE!
 Stalley
 K. Sparks
 Joe Conzo
 James Blagden
 Phony Ppl
 The Stuyvesants
 K-Salaam
 Sene
 Sophia Urista
 Evil Dee of Da Beatminerz and Black Moon (group)
 Martha Cooper
 Dr. Larry Simpson of Berklee College of Music
 Ralph McDaniels aka “Uncle Ralph” of Video Music Box
 Torae (Final Day host) 
 DJ Meka

2012
"Busta Rhymes & Friends" special presentation:
 Busta Rhymes
 Spliff Star
 DJ Scratch
 Lil Fame of M.O.P.
 Slick Rick
 Buckshot of Black Moon
 Smif-n-Wessun (Tek and Steele)
 Reek Da Villain
 Leaders Of The New School (Busta Rhymes, Dinco D, Charlie Brown and Cut Monitor Milo)
 Q-Tip (musician) and Phife Dawg of A Tribe Called Quest

Additional artists:
 Freeway (rapper)
 KA w/DJ Esquire
 Clear Soul Forces
 Jasmine Solano
 MeLo-X
 Chuwee
 Bill Adler
 Johnny Temple
 Fred "Bugsy" Buggs
 Nelson George
 Tyrone "FlyTy" Williams
 Charlie Ahearn (director)
 Chairman Mao of Egotripland
 Ali Shaheed Muhammad of A Tribe Called Quest
 Young Guru 
 Fat Tony
 Ralph McDaniels aka "Uncle Ralph" of Video Music Box
 Evitan (Dres of Black Sheep and Jarobi of A Tribe Called Quest)
 Chuck Chillout
 DJ Scratch
 Bob Slade
 Sucio Smash
 CSC Funk Band
 Ana Tijoux
 1982 (Statik Selektah + Termanology) & Reks 
 Maya Azucena (Final Day host)
 Kosha Dillz (Final Day Host) 
 M. Will 
 Jay Dixon
 Top $ Raz (Show & Prove host) 
 DJ RawBeatz
 Evil Dee of Da Beatminerz and Black Moon (group)
 DJ DP One
 Dart Parker 
 KJ Butta
 Amy Linden
 Pop Master Fabel 
 Kevie Kev
 DJ Emskee
 $amhill
 DJ Wayneski  of Da Beatminerz
 DJ Jenny Blaze

2013
 Redman (rapper)
 Pusha T
 EPMD
 F.Stokes
 DJ Enuff
 Dyme-A-Duzin 
 Dizzy Wright
 Dillon Cooper 
 Lords of the Underground 
 Das EFX
 Ralph McDaniels aka "Uncle Ralph" of Video Music Box

Additional Artists / Special Guests:
 Soul Understated
 Danse of BKLYN STICKUP
 DJ Raw Beats
 Kon Boogie

2014
 Raekwon The Chef of Wu-Tang Clan
 Jay Electronica
 CJ Fly of Pro Era
 Cyhi The Prince
 DJ Rob Swift
 The Audible Doctor 
 Kydd Jones

Additional Artists / Special Guests
 Jay-Z
 Talib Kweli
 J. Cole
 LC The Poet
 AZ
 Mac Miller
 Bobby Shmurda
 Brand Nubian
 Tonya Morgan
 Beatnuts 
 Troy Ave.

2015
 Common
 Mobb Deep
 Lion Babe
 Freeway
 Charles Hamilton
 Pitch Blak Brass Band
 Skyzoo
 John Robinson
 Rob Swift
 Torae
 "Uncle Ralph" McDaniels
 Large Professor 
 Consequence 
 Foxy Brown 
 Astro Kid

2016
 Nas
 The Soul Rebels
 Fabolous 
 Talib Kweli
 Rapsody
 DJ Rob Swift
 Ralph McDaniels
 Your Old Droog
 Taylor Bennett
 Nick Grant
 Radamiz
 Torae
 Skyzoo
 Money & Violence
 Moruf
 Oshun
 Deray Mckesson
 Combat Jack
 Ibrahim H. (Dreamville)
 Kim Osorio
 Sam Pollard
 Bill Adler
 Masego
 Kazeem Famuyide
 Brandon "Jinx" Jenkins
 Julian Mitchell
 Jamie "Marlo" Hector
 Greg Tate
 Melo X
 Wayno
 Jen Bklyn
 Chrybaby Cozie & Litefeet Nation
 Lavan Wright
 Lenny Bass
 Sean Williams
 Jason Nelson
 Calvan Fowler
 Randy Wilkins
 Cat Daddy Slim
 DJ Midnight
 Kerim The DJ
 House Arrest 2
 Justin Milhouse
 Fred Daniels
 Andy Mac
 B. Seth
 Mr. D.T.
 Tia Williams
 Timothy Wellbeck
 Trisha Bell
 Stephen A. Levite
 Lindsay Fauntleroy
 Dr. Michael A. Lindsey
 Dr. Naemma Burgess
 Wes & Ebonie Jackson
 Juels Pierrot

Additional Artists / Special Guests
 Buckshot
 Smif-N-Wessun
 Masta Ace
 Special Ed of the Crooklyn Dodgers 
 Dyme-A-Duzin

2017
 Rakim
 DMX
 The Lox
 Bas
 Cozz
 Omen
 Bobbito Garcia
 Mister Cee
 Oshun
 Earthgang
 DJ Rob Swift
 Ralph McDaniels
 Torae
 Linda Sarsour
 Fab 5 Freddy
 Kerim The DJ
 Soul Summit
 Sickamore
 Malik The Drummer
 Ginny Suss
 Rob Stone
 Julian Mitchell
 Ryan Leslie
 Nadeska Alexis
 DJ Midnight
 Jamilah Lemieux
 Erik Parker
 Lite Feet Nation
 April Walker
 Datwon Thomas
 Chuck Creekmur
 Timothy Anne Burnside
 Denzil Porter
 Oswin Benjamin
 Trent The Hooligan

Additional Artists / Special Guests
 Buckshot
  Havoc
 Smif-N-Wessun
 Junior M.A.F.I.A.
 M.O.P.

2018

 Black Star (Yasiin Bey & Talib Kweli) 
 Pharoahe Monch w/ DJ Boogie Blind
 Mister Cee
 Skyzoo
 Statik Selektah
 Ralph McDaniels
 Torae
 Dyme-A-Duzin
 Caleborate
 Latasha
 Radamiz
 Oswin Benjamin
 Chrybaby Cozie
 Milo Case
 Anoyd
 Don Mykel
 Clean Fresh Air
 Kerim The DJ
 Midnite
 DJ Scott Lauren
 April Reign
 Kameron Mccullough
 April Walker
 Lorrie Boula
 Nadeska Alexis
 Ali Bianchi
 John Henry
 Ebonie Smith
 Dev Smith
 Wes & Ebonie Jackson

Additional Artists / Special Guests

 Prince Po of Organized Konfusion
 Lil' Fame of M.O.P.
  O.C.
 CJ Fly
 Termanology
 Gorilla Nems

See also

List of hip hop music festivals
Hip hop culture

References

External links
 BrooklynBodega.com

Culture of Brooklyn
Hip hop music festivals in the United States
Music festivals established in 2005
Music festivals in New York City